Jeff Morrow (1907–1993) was an American actor.

Jeff Morrow may also refer to:
Geoff Morrow